Ranjit Chowdhry (19 September 1955 – 15 April 2020) was an Indian character actor, known for his roles in television, movies, and theatre. He appeared in two episodes of The Office, as Vikram, a telemarketer who worked with Michael, and was briefly hired for The Michael Scott Paper Company.

For his role as Rocky in Deepa Mehta's 2002 film Bollywood/Hollywood, he was nominated for Best Performance by an Actor in a Supporting Role at the 23rd Genie Awards His other most noted role was in Last Holiday (2006), starring Queen Latifah.

Life and career 
Ranjit was born and raised in Mumbai in a family with a theatre background, where he received his early education at Campion School, Mumbai, and started his acting career. His father is from a Gujjar background, while his mother, Pearl Padamsee, was of partial Jewish descent on her mother's side, but remained Christian during her life. He made his film debut in Basu Chatterjee's Khatta Meetha, following which he played prominent parts in Hindi comedy classics such as Basu Chatterjee's Baton Baton Mein (1979) and Hrishikesh Mukherjee's Khubsoorat (1980). Thereafter, he moved to the United States in the early 1980s. He wrote the screenplay and acted in Sam & Me (directed by Deepa Mehta), which won an honorable mention at Cannes in 1991.

He was a guest star in Law & Order: Special Victims Unit, and had appeared in two seasons of The Office and Prison Break.

Sanjay Gupta, who worked with Chowdhry on the film Kaante, tweeted that his performances were a joy and "KHATTA MEETHA is my favourite."

Personal life
His mother, Pearl Padamsee, was a well-known theatre personality, drama teacher and actress on stage and film. His stepfather, Alyque Padamsee, was a theatre actor and director who also headed an advertising company in Mumbai. He had one older sister named Rohini (c. 1951 – 26 September 1961), who died from nephritis.

Chowdhry was admitted into Breach Candy Hospital, in Mumbai, on 14 April 2020 for a ruptured ulcer in the intestine, and underwent emergency surgery. He died on 15 April 2020 from COVID-19. He was in Mumbai for a dental procedure, and was delayed there due to the spread of COVID-19.

Filmography

References

External links 
 
  Interview with Ranjit Chowdhry including a photograph

1955 births
2020 deaths
American male actors of Indian descent
Male actors in Hindi cinema
American male film actors
American male television actors
American male stage actors
Male actors from Mumbai
Indian people of Jewish descent
Jewish American male actors
Indian emigrants to the United States
21st-century American Jews
Deaths from the COVID-19 pandemic in India
Indian Jews